Jose Maria Ramos de Leon Jr. (born October 14, 1946), professionally known as Joey de Leon, is a Filipino comedian, actor, television presenter and songwriter. He hosts the noontime variety show Eat Bulaga! He is a member of the comedy trio Tito, Vic and Joey that has made several comedy movies and TV shows.

Early life
De Leon was the second child of Jose Seoane de Leon (1918–2008) of Spanish Filipino descent, and Emma Manahan Ramos (1925–2019). His paternal grandfather was the first mayor of Malolos, Bulacan. When he was three years old, his parents divorced. His father then moved to Madrid, Spain and eventually remarried.

Career 

Prior to being an entertainer, de Leon earned his architecture degree from the National University in Manila. He was also a disc jockey for 12 radio stations when he was starting out. De Leon started his showbiz career in the 1960s as a radio disc jockey and announcer. He worked for 12 radio stations, including all seven radio stations owned by ABS-CBN Corporation as well as other broadcasters like KBS. His first big break on TV was IBC 13's gag show OK Lang.

Tito, Vic and Joey 
In 1975, de Leon became a co-host of GMA Network's late afternoon variety show Discorama hosted by Bobby Ledesma. He invited his former co-stars at OK Lang, the Sotto brothers Tito, Vic and Val, to join him at Discorama. Only Tito and Vic accepted de Leon's invitation. The newly-formed trio began to do comedy newscast segments interspersed with Top 40 hit-song parodies. Originally, the trio's appearance was supposed to be a one-off invitation as Discorama was set to be axed but after getting good feedback from the viewers and ratings were high, the show was given a new lease on life by GMA management. The trio was later invited to become part of the noontime show Student Canteen as they released 12 albums based on their Discorama Tough Hits segment.

The sitcom Iskul Bukol gave them nationwide fame as comedians. Soon after, other TV and movie offers came knocking on the trio's door.

In 1979, Tito, Vic and Joey began hosting the noontime show Eat Bulaga!, which was pitted against the more established Student Canteen. Not long after, Eat Bulaga! toppled Student Canteen from the ratings. The trio is still active on both Holy Week Dramas every Lenten Season and also on comedy variety show on Eat Bulaga!.

Solo artist 
Although de Leon continued to do movies alongside his showbiz teammates Tito and Vic, he started doing solo performances for other TV shows. He top billed Joey and Son in 1982, a sitcom on RPN where he played father to a young boy named "Jeffrey Laperal" played back then by Ian Veneracion. He was also one of the gag performers on TODAS where his co-stars included Jimmy Santos and Val Sotto. Other TV shows included Apple Pie, Patis, Atbp., the Sharon Cuneta Show, and Let's Go Crazy. He was launched by Viva Films as a solo comedian in She-Man: Mistress of the Universe. He also tried his hand at directing films like Romeo Loves Juliet and Small, Medium, Large.

De Leon's films include Starzan. De Leon did several TV shows for GMA Network and ABC. In 1995, he made a film comeback via the comedy Bangers for Viva Films as well as Pipti-pipti, Ang Tipo kong Lalake and Takot Ako sa Darling Ko. He hosts Eat Bulaga! which is now the longest-running TV program in the Philippines, and appears in other shows like Mel and Joey, Startalk, Nuts Entertainment and started a new show for ABC, the now-defunct Teka Mona, which replaced Wow Mali, his long-running TV show on the same network. He started hosting Takeshi's Castle with Ryan Yllana. He is also the resident judge of the annual reality-based star search StarStruck and writes the entertainment column "De Leon's Den" once a week in the Philippine broadsheet Manila Bulletin.

In December 2006, de Leon returned to recording with a novelty song he wrote titled "Itaktak Mo" ("Shake It Off"). Seen by critics as his answer to the other wildly popular hit "Boom Tarat Tarat" (written by Lito Camo and sung by de Leon's rival host Willie Revillame), "Itaktak Mo" was softly launched on Eat Bulaga! shortly before the Christmas season. In January 2007, the song was launched on de Leon's album, Joey to the World 2 and gained airplay in most FM stations. "Itaktak Mo" has also become part of Eat Bulaga!s segment "Taktak Mo o Tatakbo" that replaced "Laban o Bawi", and is also one of the official dances of the 4th batch of the reality talent search StarStruck.

After "Itaktak Mo" became one of the most requested dance tunes of 2007, de Leon followed it up with "Kagat Labi Song", which was launched on Eat Bulaga! on September 22, 2007. The "Kagat Labi" dance craze was already sweeping the whole country by storm before de Leon wrote it. On February 24, 2008, de Leon released a song titled "Walang Daya" ("No Cheating") with lyrics comparing his love to his rival host Willie Revillame's misfortunes (Wilyonaryo, Ferrari and Ultra stampede). He first sang it on his own program Mel and Joey.

On July 31, 2008, de Leon tendered his irrevocable resignation as columnist ("De Leon's Den") for Manila Bulletin, and he is currently with The Philippine Star, and has a column, "Me, Starzan".

In late 2009, he wrote another hit Eat Bulaga! song titled "Ba Ba Boom". Then in early 2010, he wrote another song, "Aalog-Alog". He also wrote the theme song for Diz Iz It!.

In 2011, he played as Pablo Apostol, the rock-star father of George Apostol/DJ Heidee played by Sarah Geronimo in the romantic-comedy film Won't Last a Day Without You.

As a songwriter 
De Leon wrote most of the lyrics of VST & Co. songs and some Cinderella songs. He also co-wrote "Ilagay Mo Kid" with Mike Hanopol which was performed by Hagibis. He also wrote "Ang Labo Mo" for Sharon Cuneta.

Controversies

Pepsi Paloma gang rape case

15-year old actress Pepsi Paloma accused de Leon and fellow comedians Vic Sotto and Richie D'Horsie of gang raping and taking photos of her on June 21, 1982, in a room at the Sulo Hotel in Quezon City. On July 31, Paloma's manager Rey dela Cruz lodged a formal complaint with Defense Minister Juan Ponce Enrile. On August 18, 1982, Paloma filed charges of rape and acts of lasciviousness against the three television personalities before the Quezon City fiscal's office. The crime of rape at the time, carried the death penalty in the Philippines, and to prevent his brother and his cohorts from being sent to the electric chair, Tito Sotto quickly went to see Paloma while she was still securing the services of Atty. Rene Cayetano. According to Paloma, Tito Sotto coerced her into signing an "Affidavit of Desistance" to drop the rape charges against his brother and cohorts—Tito Sotto had allegedly placed a pistol on the table in front of Paloma when he went to talk to her.

Depression comments
On October 5, 2017, de Leon elicited controversy from Filipino netizens and high-profile figures advocating for mental health awareness, following a remark he made about depression during the Eat Bulaga! segment "Juan for All, All for Juan", saying in part that the mental disorder is "just something made up by people" and that "they do it to themselves". He apologized the following day.

Filmography

Film

Television

Albums/songs discography
TVJ Tough Hits series (12 albums) (Vicor Music Corp.)
1990: Joey de Leon Tough Hits 1990 (OctoArts International, now PolyEast Records)
1993: JoeyRassic (MCA Music)
1999: Mga Pakyuuuut ni Joey de Leon (OctoArts-EMI Music, now PolyEast Records)
2003: "Spageti Song" (duet with Sexbomb Girls from the album Round 2) (Sony BMG)
2004: "Halukay Ube" (duet with Sexbomb Girls from the album Bomb Thr3at) (Sony BMG)
2004: Joey to the World (Sony BMG Music)
2007: Joey to the World 2 (Sony BMG Music) (featuring "Itaktak Mo")
2008: Kagat Labi (EMI Philippines, now PolyEast Records)

Awards

References

External links

1946 births
Living people
ABS-CBN personalities
Arellano University alumni
De La Salle University alumni
Filipino male comedians
20th-century Filipino male singers
Filipino songwriters
Filipino people of Spanish descent
Filipino television talk show hosts
Filipino television variety show hosts
GMA Network personalities
Intercontinental Broadcasting Corporation personalities
TV5 (Philippine TV network) personalities
Male actors from Bulacan
Manila Bulletin people
National University (Philippines) alumni
The Philippine Star people
Radio Philippines Network personalities
Singers from Bulacan